Frontier Fury may refer to:

Film
 The Lone Rider in Frontier Fury, a 1941 entry in the Lone Rider series of Westerns
 Frontier Fury, a 1943 Charles Starrett Western

Literature
 Frontier Fury, a 1992 Will Henry Western novel
 Frontier Fury, a 2010 entry in The Executioner series of novels